Harrison Dalton (1825 – 14 July 1881) was an English cricketer. He was christened at Stowmarket, Suffolk on 20 July 1825.

A batsman of unknown style, Dalton made a single appearance first-class cricket for the Marylebone Cricket Club (MCC) against Oxford University in 1846 at the Magdalen Ground, Oxford. In a match which the MCC won by three wickets, Dalton ended the MCC's first-innings not out on 1 run, while in their second-innings he was dismissed for 6 runs by Gerald Yonge. Dalton batted at number eleven in the MCC first-innings, but opened the batting alongside Roger Kynaston in their second-innings.

He died at Bradford, Yorkshire on 14 July 1881.

References

External list
Harrison Dalton at ESPNcricinfo
Harrison Dalton at CricketArchive

1825 births
1881 deaths
People from Stowmarket
English cricketers
Marylebone Cricket Club cricketers